Canadice Lake  is the smallest Finger Lake of western New York. The name is derived from the Iroquois word ska-ne-a-dice, meaning long lake.

Description

The lake is used as a water source of Rochester, New York. Swimming, camping and contamination of the water are prohibited. Previously, a free permit was required to fish or boat on the lake, but that permit system has been discontinued and they are no longer required.

Recreation

Canadice Lake features several trout species for recreational fishing, including lake trout, brown trout and rainbow trout. All three trout species are annually stocked in the lake by the New York State Department of Environmental Conservation. Landlocked Atlantic salmon are occasionally stocked as well.

An unimproved gravel boat ramp is available for launching boats on the lake's east side, and a cartop launch is available at the south end of the lake.

See also

References

External links
Hemlock-Canadice Unit Management Plan
Hemlock-Canadice State Forest (NYS DEC page) 

Finger Lakes
Protected areas of Ontario County, New York
Lakes of New York (state)
Lakes of Ontario County, New York